Celypha is a genus of tortrix moths (family Tortricidae). It belongs to the tribe Olethreutini of subfamily Olethreutinae.

The closely related genus Syricoris is sometimes included in Celypha.

Taxonomy

Species
The twenty currently recognized species of Celypha are:

 Celypha anatoliana (Caradja, 1916)
 Celypha argyrata Razowski, 2009
 Celypha atriapex Razowski, 2009
 Celypha aurofasciana
 Celypha capreolana (Herrich-Schäffer, 1851)
 Celypha cespitana
 Celypha conflictana (Kennel, 1901)
 Celypha constructa (Meyrick, 1922)
 Celypha cornigerus (Oku, 1968)
 Celypha ermolenkoi Kostyuk, 1980
 Celypha erythrana (Tengstrom, 1848)
 Celypha flavipalpana (Herrich-Schäffer, 1851)
 Celypha hydrangeana (Kuznetzov, 1969)
 Celypha kostjukorum Budashkin & Dubatolov, 2006
 Celypha kurilensis (Oku, 1965)
 Celypha perfracta Diakonoff, 1983
 Celypha pseudalarixicola Liu & Fang in Jianwen & Liu, 1992
 Celypha rufana
 Celypha rurestrana (Duponchel in Godart, 1842)
 Celypha sapaecola Razowski, 2009
 Celypha sistrata (Meyrick, 1911)
 Celypha striana
 Celypha woodiana (Barrett, 1882)

Synonyms
Obsolete scientific names (junior synonyms and others) for this genus are:
 Celypa (lapsus)
 Celyphoides Obraztsov, 1960
 Cleyphoides (lapsus)
 Euchroma (lapsus, non Solier, 1833: preoccupied)
 Euchromia Stephens, 1829 (non Hübner, [1819]: preoccupied)
 Loxoterma Busck, 1906

Due to the very close relationship between Celypha and the "wastebin genus" Olethreutes, there has been some confusion about the former's synonymy. Celyphoides and Loxoterma are sometimes listed as a synonym of Olethreutes. But the type species of the first is Tortrix flavipalpana (a junior synonym of C. flavipalpana), and that of the second is T. latifasciana (a junior synonym of C. aurofasciana). This makes Celyphoides and Loxoterma junior subjective synonyms of Celypha, at least in its present delimitation.

Celyphoides, meanwhile, was a nomen nudum for 5 years. It was first used by R. Agenjo Cecilia in 1955, but only properly established by N.S. Obraztsov in 1960.

Footnotes

References
  (2009a): Online World Catalogue of the Tortricidae – Genus Celypha account. Version 1.3.1. Retrieved 2009-JAN-20.
  (2009b): Online World Catalogue of the Tortricidae – Celypha species list. Version 1.3.1. Retrieved 2009-JAN-20.
  (2005a): Markku Savela's Lepidoptera and some other life forms – Celypha. Version of 2005-SEP-14. Retrieved 2010-APR-15.
  (2005b): Markku Savela's Lepidoptera and some other life forms – Olethreutes. Version of 2005-SEP-16. Retrieved 2010-APR-15.

Olethreutini
Tortricidae genera
Taxa named by Jacob Hübner